Caeli may refer to :

Astronomy
Stars in the constellation Caelum, including:
Alpha Caeli
Beta Caeli

Music
Caeli enarrant..., the name of a large-scale cycle of musical works by composer Georges Lentz

Religion
Ad Caeli Reginam, an encyclical of Pope Pius XII in 1954
Rorate caeli, the opening words of the Book of Isaiah, 45:8, in the Vulgate, is a text used in the Catholic liturgy
"Regina caeli", an ancient Latin marian hymn of the Christian Church

See also
 Includes other stars in the constellation Caelum

Caelis, restaurant in Spain